Hanson Horsey (November 26, 1889 – December 1, 1949) was an American professional baseball player who played in one game for the Cincinnati Reds during the  season.
He was born in Galena, Maryland and died in Millington, Maryland at the age of 60.

He began his minor league career in 1910 with the Reading Pretzels of the Tri-State League.  His best year in the minors was with Reading in 1911 when he had a record of 22-10 in 33 appearances.  After his major league appearance, he continued to play minor league baseball and later became an umpire, primarily in the Eastern Shore League.  His last season was with the Jersey City Skeeters in 1918.

External links

 https://sabr.org/bioproj/person/38c3a48e

Major League Baseball pitchers
Baseball players from Maryland
Cincinnati Reds players
1889 births
1949 deaths
People from Kent County, Maryland
Reading Pretzels players
Allentown (minor league baseball) players
Trenton Tigers players
Manchester Textiles players
Chambersburg Maroons players
Hagerstown Terriers players
Cumberland Colts players
Jersey City Skeeters players